Fuscopannaria hirsuta is a species of squamulose (scaley), corticolous (bark-dwelling) lichen in the family Pannariaceae. Found in China, it was formally described as a new species in 2004 by Norwegian lichenologist Per Magnus Jørgensen. It has also been recorded growing on Juniperus bark. The species epithet hirsuta refers to the hairy upper thallus surface, the first in genus Fuscopannaria with this characteristic.

References

hirsuta
Lichen species
Lichens described in 2004
Taxa named by Per Magnus Jørgensen
Lichens of China